The San Diego Formation is a geologic formation in southwestern San Diego County in southern California (United States), and northwestern Baja California (México).

Geology 
It is a coastal transitional marine and non-marine pebble and cobble conglomerate deposit and marine sandstone rock with marine fossils, from a former bay, deposited during the Middle Pliocene to Late Pliocene ages (2–3 million years ago), of the Pliocene period during the Cenozoic Era.

This formation is found from the south side of Mount Soledad in San Diego County to Rosarito Beach in northern Baja California, including Tijuana, Mexico, and the southwestern corner of San Diego County from San Ysidro to Pacific Beach.

San Diego Formation deposits were formed in a large, open, crescent-shaped bay similar in size to Monterey Bay that existed on the coast in Pliocene times.

Aquifer
The formation contains the San Diego Formation Basin, a large aquifer under Imperial Beach, Chula Vista, National City, and southern portions of the city of San Diego. 
The San Diego Formation Basin is a confined shallow aquifer. The groundwater in the San Diego Formation is brackish, and its quality is considered to be fair to poor. Due to its proximity to the ocean, the risk of seawater intrusion is a primary concern regarding water quality. To avoid intrusion, the Sweetwater Authority constantly monitors the basin water levels, which have remained stable since the 1980s. A factor that contributes to limit the groundwater pumping is the importation of Colorado River water. However, to reduce demands for imported water, there have been installed desalination plants. The Richard A. Reynolds Groundwater Desalination Facility, in Chula Vista, was completed in 1999 and holds a production capacity of 4 million gallons of drinking water per day. The Claude “Bud” Lewis Carlsbad Desalination Plant, in San Diego, was completed in 2015 and produces 50 million gallons of water per day. In this way, these plants contribute to reducing vulnerability and secure water supply, especially during drought periods. The use of groundwater contributes to a regional effort to reduce demands for imported water.

Fossil content 
Besides those of clams and other mollusks, quite a few bird fossils (which are generally rare) have been found in this geological formation. Among them is a possible ancestor of Cassin's auklet (Ptychoramphus aleuticus) and the loons Gavia concinna and G. howardae. The former was quite likely a close relative or even ancestor of the large black-headed loons; the latter was perhaps a small relative of the large grey-headed loons.

Fauna

Cetaceans

Mysticetes

Odontocetes

Pinnipeds

Sirenians

See also 

 
 Pisco Formation
 Urumaco

References

Further reading 
 
 
 

Geologic formations of California
Geologic formations of Mexico
Pliocene California
Neogene Mexico
Piacenzian
Conglomerate formations
Sandstone formations of the United States
Paleontology in Mexico
Paleontology in California
Aquifers in California
Geography of San Diego
Geology of San Diego County, California